The United Kingdom Council for Psychotherapy (UKCP) is a professional association of psychotherapy organisations and practitioners in the United Kingdom. It is restricted to registered clinical psychotherapists and psychotherapeutic counsellors (similar, but with shorter training).

Constitution
The UKCP exists to "promote and maintain the profession of psychotherapy and the highest standards in the practice of psychotherapy throughout the United Kingdom, for the benefit of the public." Only psychotherapists or psycho-therapeutic counselors who meet UKCP's training requirements and abide by its ethical guidelines are included in its online "Register of Psychotherapists".

The UKCP was initially founded in the 1980s as the United Kingdom Standing Conference for Psychotherapy following the Foster Report (1971) and the Sieghart Report (1978), which recommended regulation of the psychotherapy field. It was formally inaugurated as a council in 1993.

The UKCP has since evolved into a national umbrella organisation for most major psychotherapeutic modalities. As of 2012, there are more than 70 member organisations representing all the main traditions in the practice of psychotherapy.

The council is run by a board of trustees which is elected by the council's members. A number of subcommittees, including the ethics committee, report directly to the board of trustees.

UKCP also represents the United Kingdom in the European Association for Psychotherapy (EAP) – a Vienna-based umbrella organisation which sets standards for equivalence of training and practice throughout Europe — and is part of the National Awarding Organization (NAO) overseeing the European Certificate of Psychotherapy (ECP) award in the UK.

Objectives

To promote the art and science of psychotherapy and psychotherapeutic counselling for the public benefit
To promote research in psychotherapy and psychotherapeutic counselling, and to disseminate the results of any such research
To promote high standards of education, training and practice in psychotherapy and psychotherapeutic counselling
To promote the wider provision of psychotherapy and psychotherapeutic counselling for all sections of the public

Campaigns

The UKCP's campaign work has included collaboration with NICE and the Health Professions Council. Campaigns have included:

 NICE under scrutiny
 NICE consultations
 Reparative therapy
 Services under threat
 Skills for Health

Regulatory role

The UKCP regards the regulation of psychotherapists and the public accountability of their practice as important means to safeguard the interests of patients, clients, and the reputation of registered practitioners. The present Register is voluntary — it is not required by any Act of Parliament — but the UKCP is campaigning with other related organisations for the statutory regulation of the "talking therapy" professions.

The UKCP delegates the accreditation and re-accreditation of members to UKCP organizational members. Organizational members may be designated as "training", "accrediting" or both. Individual psychotherapists can join the UKCP register only following accreditation by one of these organisations. At present there is no way of registering directly with UKCP.

The UKCP does not run courses leading to UKCP accreditation; courses are provided by its organisational members. Some training organisations also accredit and will award Accreditation of Prior Learning (APL) or give credit for previous training experience.

Candidates for registration who trained on a course that does not lead directly to membership need to seek accreditation by an accrediting organisation member.

Despite the UKCP stating that "We exist to promote and maintain high standards of practice of psychotherapy and psychotherapeutic counselling for the benefit of the public throughout the United Kingdom", there have been numerous complaints and instances of UKCP registered therapists violating the rights of their clients, harming them psychologically, emotionally and sexually.  Some of these instances have resulted in therapists escaping any concrete punishments for their actions and being allowed to continue practicing. One case involved the sexual abuse of a mentally ill client by a therapist registered with the Guild of Analytical Psychologists, a member organisation of the UKCP, with the therapist receiving a suspension only.  A report carried out by unsafespaces.com found that one in four therapists continue to practice despite being struck off by member institutions.

Chair
UKCP elects its chair among its members.

Structure
Board of Trustees
UKCP colleges
UKCP committees
Faculties and groups
Members’ Forum
Special interest groups

UKCP colleges

There are 11 UKCP colleges:

Cognitive Psychotherapies College (CPC)
College of Child and Adolescent Psychotherapies (C-CAP)
College for Family, Couple and Systemic Therapy (CFCST)
College of Hypno-psychotherapists (CH-P)
College of Medical Psychotherapists (CMP)
College for Sexual and Relationship Psychotherapy (CSRP)
Constructivist and Existential College (CEC)
Council for Psychoanalysis and Jungian Analysis College (CPJAC)
Humanistic and Integrative Psychotherapy College (HIPC)
Psychotherapeutic Counselling and Intersubjective Psychotherapy College (PCIPC)
Universities Training College (UTC)

See also
British Association for Counselling and Psychotherapy
British Psychoanalytic Council

General:
Mental health in the United Kingdom

References

External links
 UKCP official website

1993 establishments in the United Kingdom
Health in the London Borough of Islington
Organisations based in the London Borough of Islington
Organizations established in 1993
Professional associations based in the United Kingdom
Psychology organisations based in the United Kingdom
Psychotherapy in the United Kingdom
Psychotherapy organizations